Wuzuolou Forest Park is a large natural reserve and public park located in the northern suburb of Beijing, China.

The park covers a total area of 1,400 hectares, and the highest peak within the Wuzuolou Forest Park is 1020 metres above sea level.  About 73% of the park is covered by forest, and the coverage includes high and steep mountains, deep valleys, thick forests, deep ponds and waterfall. Notable sites within the forest park include Bixia Dai Spring House, Forest Park, and Qiuhong winter white.

Parks in Beijing